Herteh Kola (also Romanized as Herţeh Kolā; also known as Hart Kolā and Hert Kalā) is a village in Kelarestaq-e Gharbi Rural District, in the Central District of Chalus County, Mazandaran Province, Iran. At the 2006 census, its population was 1,009, in 280 families.

References 

Populated places in Chalus County